Konsthall is the Swedish term for art gallery and may refer to:

, a contemporary art venue in Stockholm; see 
Edsvik Konsthall, a gallery of contemporary art at Edsberg, North of Stockholm
Göteborgs Konsthall, a museum of contemporary art in Gothenburg (Göteborg)
Liljevalchs konsthall, an art gallery located on Djurgården island in Stockholm
, a contemporary art venue in Lund
Malmö Konsthall, an exhibition hall in Malmö
Röda Sten Konsthall, a contemporary art center in Gothenburg, Sweden
Tensta Konsthall, a centre for contemporary art in the Stockholm suburb of Tensta

See also
 Kunsthalle, the German term for art gallery

pt:Konsthall
sv:Konsthall